Dany Cooper is an Australian film editor, best known for her work on Candy, Queen of the Damned and The Sapphires. Cooper is a member of the ASE guild.

Filmography

References

External links

Living people
Australian film editors
Year of birth missing (living people)
Australian women film editors